Nicolas Née (born November 8, 2002) is an American soccer player who plays as a winger for Princeton Tigers.

Club career
Solar Soccer Club: 2018-2019 U17 DA Champs.

Née joined the New York Red Bulls academy in 2019, having previously played with USSDA academy team Solar SC.

Née played for New York Red Bulls II as an academy player, making his debut on June 25, 2021, appearing as an 83rd-minute substitute during a 2–1 loss to Pittsburgh Riverhounds.

In the fall of 2021, Née went to play college soccer at Princeton University.

Career statistics

Club

References

2002 births
Living people
American soccer players
Association football forwards
New York Red Bulls II players
USL Championship players
Soccer players from Texas
Princeton Tigers men's soccer players